Nucleoporin p58/p45 is a protein that in humans is encoded by the NUPL1 gene.

This gene encodes a member of the nucleoporin family that shares 87% sequence identity with rat nucleoporin p58. The protein is localized to the nuclear rim and is a component of the nuclear pore complex (NPC). 

All molecules entering or leaving the nucleus either diffuse through or are actively transported by the NPC. Alternate transcriptional splice variants, encoding different isoforms, have been characterized.

References

Further reading